Hopea ultima is a species of plant in the family Dipterocarpaceae. It is endemic to Papua New Guinea.

References

ultima
Trees of Papua New Guinea
Data deficient plants
Taxonomy articles created by Polbot
Plants described in 1978